Prashanth Sellathurai (born 1 October 1986) is an Australian gymnast. His parents and ancestors are of Sri Lankan Tamil heritage and came as refugees fleeing Sri Lanka;  he was born and raised in Australia. He was educated at Trinity Grammar School (New South Wales) in Sydney's west.

Sellathurai was part of the Australian men's squad which won its first team gold medal in the Commonwealth Games at the 2010 event in New Delhi, which was sealed by his performance on the rings. He also won the pommel horse event in Delhi.

He is a three-time medallist on the pommel horse at the World Championships (two bronzes and one silver). He was a resident of Sydney, New South Wales.

He now volunteers at Milton Keynes Gymnastics, England.

Sellathurai is a qualified medical doctor, having obtained his medical degree from the University of Buckingham in 2019.

References

External links
 
 
 
 

Australian male artistic gymnasts
Living people
1986 births
Commonwealth Games gold medallists for Australia
Gymnasts at the 2010 Commonwealth Games
Gymnasts at the 2006 Commonwealth Games
Australian people of Sri Lankan Tamil descent
Medalists at the World Artistic Gymnastics Championships
Australian Institute of Sport gymnasts
Commonwealth Games silver medallists for Australia
Commonwealth Games bronze medallists for Australia
Commonwealth Games medallists in gymnastics
Universiade medalists in gymnastics
Universiade gold medalists for Australia
Medalists at the 2011 Summer Universiade
Medallists at the 2006 Commonwealth Games
Medallists at the 2010 Commonwealth Games